Zhou Dongyu is a Chinese actress, who gained recognition after appearing in Zhang Yimou's film Under the Hawthorn Tree. She was also chosen by Southern Metropolis Daily as one of the "Four Dan actresses of the post-90s Generation", along with Zheng Shuang, 
Guan Xiaotong and Yang Zi. In 2016, she won the Golden Horse Award for Best Leading Actress with her performance in Soul Mate. In 2020, she won the Hong Kong Film Award for Best Actress and Golden Rooster Award for Best Actress with her performance in Better Days.

Zhou ranked 71st on Forbes China Celebrity 100 list in 2017, 7th in 2019, and 3rd in 2020.

Early life and education 
Zhou was born in Shijiazhuang, Hebei to an ordinary working family. When she was in the third grade of primary school, her father died in a car accident, and her mother later remarried. She practiced gymnastics as a child and joined the Shijiazhuang gymnastics team at the age of 12. In middle school, she studied in Shijiazhuang No. 27 Middle School Class 9 in 2004 and Shijiazhuang No. 12 Middle School in Class 2007.

Career

2010–2015: Rising recognition

In 2010, Zhou was picked by Zhang Yimou to star in his film Under the Hawthorn Tree, despite having no acting experience prior to taking on the role.  She rose to fame for her appearance in the film and won several awards, including the Best Actress at the 56th Valladolid International Film Spain Festival, Outstanding New Actress at the 14th Huabiao Award and Best New Performer at the 20th Shanghai Film Critics Awards.

In 2011, she starred in Barbara Wong's romance film The Allure of Tears; and also featured in war film The Road Of Exploring, playing Yang Kaihui, the wife of political leader Mao Zedong.

In 2013, she starred in historical romance film The Palace, the fourth installment of the Gong series by Yu Zheng. Variety praised her performance saying, "Zhou holds the screen very well, turning an initially daft personality into an angsty but stoical heroine".

In 2014, she starred alongside Lin Gengxin in youth romance film My Old Classmate. The film topped China's box office and Zhou was praised for her "acting breakthrough". The same year, she featured in comedy Breakup Buddies. Opposite to her usual pure and fresh image, Zhou challenged the role of a "Smart" in the film. Breakup Buddies became one of the highest-grossing films of all time in China.

In 2015, she starred opposite Ethan Juan in suspense film The Unbearable Lightness of Inspector Fan and youth drama The Ark of Mr. Chow alongside Sun Honglei.

2016–present: Critical acclaim

Zhou achieved breakthrough with her performance in the film Soul Mate, based on the novel of the same name by Anni Baobei. Zhou received the Best Actress award at the 53rd Golden Horse Awards together with her Soul Mate co-star Sandra Ma, and also won Best Actress at the 28th Hong Kong Film Critics Society Award. The same year, she won the Best Actress award at the 8th Macau International Movie Festival for her performance in the South Korean-Chinese romance film Never Said Goodbye. Zhou also starred in her first television series, spy war drama Sparrow. The series was commercially successful, and became the highest rated war drama to date with a peak rating of 2.46 and 11 billion online views. Zhou was praised by both the audience and director for successfully tackling a challenging role.

In 2017, Zhou starred alongside Takeshi Kaneshiro in the romantic comedy This Is Not What I Expected. The film grossed over 100 million yuan and received an 8.9 out of 10 score on Maoyan. Along with the success of Soul Mate, Zhou was coined the representative of Chinese chick flicks. The same year, she starred in the coming-of-age romance drama Shall I Compare You to a Spring Day alongside Zhang Yishan; and featured in science fiction wuxia film The Thousand Faces of Dunjia directed by Tsui Hark.

In 2018, Zhou starred in Rene Liu's romance film Us and Them alongside Jing Boran. It was a hit in China, earning $191 million over its first two weekends.

In 2019, Zhou starred in the youth film Better Days helmed by Soul Mate director Derek Tsang, that tackles school bullying. The film topped box office and received positive reviews. Zhou won the Best Actress at the 39th Hong Kong Film Awards for her performance. The same year, she featured in the drama film On The Balcony which she serves as one of the co-producers. Zhou ranked seventh on Forbes China Celebrity 100 list in 2019, the highest for female celebrities.

In 2021, Zhou starred alongside Xu Kai in the series Ancient Love Poetry.

Personal life
Zhou Dongyu was born in Shijiazhuang, Hebei.

Zhou graduated from the Beijing Film Academy.

At the 2010 Hawaii International Film Festival, she apologized in Mandarin that she spoke no English (unlike her co-star Shawn Dou who interpreted for her). At the 2019 Cannes Film Festival, however, she was able to talk in fluent English.

Political views 
In March 2021, Zhou terminated her contract with Burberry as brand ambassador after the company announced that they will not purchase cotton from the Chinese autonomous region of Xinjiang due to concerns of forced labor of Uyghurs. Her actions were mimicked by other Chinese celebrities.

Filmography

Film

Television series

Variety show

Discography

Singles

Awards and nominations

Forbes China Celebrity 100

References

External links
 
 
 

Living people
Actresses from Hebei
Chinese film actresses
Chinese television actresses
21st-century Chinese actresses
People from Shijiazhuang
Beijing Film Academy alumni
Best Actress Asian Film Award winners
1992 births